Lobanovo is a rural locality (a selo) and the administrative center of Lobanovskoye Rural Settlement, Permsky District, Perm Krai, Russia. The population was 4,280 as of 2010. There are 27 streets.

Geography 
Lobanovo is located 18 km south of Perm (the district's administrative centre) by road. Kochkino is the nearest rural locality.

References 

Rural localities in Permsky District